The folk music of Uttarakhand refers to the traditional and contemporary songs of Kumaon and Garhwal regions in the foothills of Himalayas. This music has its root in nature and the hilly terrain of the region.

The folk songs of Uttarakhand are a reflection of the cultural heritage and the way people live their lives in the Himalayas. Common themes in the folk music include the beauty of nature, various seasons, festivals, religious traditions, cultural practices, folk stories, historical characters, the bravery of ancestors, and love ballads.

The folk songs sung in Uttarakhandi music include the dhol damau, Turri, ransingha, dholki, daur, thali, bhankora and mashakbaja. Tabla and harmonium are also sometimes used, especially in recorded folk music from the 1960s onwards. In recent years, Uttarakhandi folk songs have transformed. Generic Indian and global musical instruments have been incorporated in modern popular folks by singers like Gajendra Rana, Narendra Singh Negi, Gopal Babu Goswami, Mohan Upreti, Chander Singh Rahi, etc. Modern themes include geopolitical issues affecting the region, humor, and nostalgia for the hills by the diaspora.

Traditional folk songs from the region, include ceremonial Mandal, martial panwara, melancholy khuder, religious jagar, thadya, and jhora.

Prominent folk artists of Uttarakhand
The earliest of the singers who left never-ending impressions on the folk music of Uttarakhand are:

 Mohan Upreti: A famous folk-singer from Kumaon, Mohan Upreti is known for his Nanda Devi Jagar & Rajula Malushahi Ballad. His iconic Kumaoni song Bedu Pako Baro Masa is fondly referred to as the cultural anthem of Uttarakhand. It is said that this song was also a favourite of former Prime Minister of India Jawahar Lal Nehru who heard it in a band march as this song is also the official regiment song of the Kumaon Regiment of Indian Army. This iconic song has been covered by various artists and dance groups all over the world.

 Narendra Singh Negi: He has sung in every style of singing popular in Uttarakhand be it Jagar, Chaumasa, Thadya, or Playback. He has sung in different local languages like Garhwali, Jaunsari, Rawalti, etc. prevailing in the state. He started his music career by releasing "Garhwali Geetmala". These Garhwali Geetmalas came in 10 different parts. His first album came with the title called Burans. Burans is a well-known flower found on hills. He has released the most super-hit albums. He has also given his voice in many Garhwali movies like "Chakrachal", "Gharjawain", "Meri Ganga Holi Ta Maima Aali" etc. This renowned singer from Garhwal has sung more than 1000 songs till now. Although he mostly composes his music in the folk genre, his lyrics depict a huge range of anxieties, tensions, and human insights of the people of Uttarakhand. His songs "Tehri Dam" and "Nauchhami Naraina" created a wave.  "Tehri Dam" was the story of the displacement of locals from their land and Nauchhami Naraina was a political satire on then Chief Minister of Uttarakhand Narayan Datt Tiwari. He is widely considered an inspirational figure in cultivating and popularizing the sounds and rhythms of Uttarakhand.

 Gopal Babu Goswami: considered to be a legend in Uttarakhand for his melodious voice. His songs on the life of the members of the armed forces and their families, like Kaile Baje Muruli, Ghughuti Na Basa and many others are legendary, it is said that when these songs were transmitted on the All India Radio, women with their husbands working far away from the Uttarakhand hills could not help but weep,  missing their husbands when they heard the soul-touching voice of Gopal Da as he was lovingly called.

 Chander Singh Rahi: fondly called the “Bhishma Pitamaha of Uttarakhand folk music” for his deep devotion to the music of Uttarakhand curated more than 2500 folk songs from Uttarakhand and gave his voice to more than 500 songs of Garhwali and Kumaoni language. He was also a talented musician, poet, and songwriter. He is known for his Uttarakhandi songs including 'Sarag tara', 'Bhana hai rangeeli bhana', 'Sauli ghura ghur', 'Saat samundar paar', 'Hilma Chandi Ku, and 'Jara thandu chla di'. He was also the first singer to sing a ghazal in Garhwali language known as Teri Mukhiri'''. Rahi has been an inspiration was for many later Garhwali singers. Garhwali singer Narendra Singh Negi has cited Chandra Singh Rahi as his inspiration. Rahi's popular songs Phyonlariya and traditional Anchari Jagar - Chaita Ki Chaitwali were remade by popular Garhwali singers in 2016 and 2018 respectively.

 Meena Rana: most recorded female singer from Uttarakhand.

 Jeet Singh Negi: veteran folk singer from Garhwal, Uttarakhand.

 Girish Tiwari 'Girda': scriptwriter, director, lyricist, singer, poet, organic culturist, literary writer, and social activist in Uttarakhand, India.

 Pritam Bhartwan: noted folk singer specializing in Jagar from Uttarakhand.

In the past decade Uttarakhandi Music has seen a revolution as various Music Recording/Cassette Producing agencies such as Rama Video Cassettes, Neelam Cassettes, and T-Series, providing opportunities for young talents from local areas, to make their Cassettes and to get the songs recorded.
This has led to a sudden surge in the number of young talents from various corners of Uttarakhand, which include famous personalities such as Lalit Mohan Joshi, Manglesh Dangwal, Gajendra Rana, B. K. Samant, Kalpana Chauhan, Maya Upadhyaya, Anuradha Nirala and Deepak Chamoli. All the famous songs and albums from Uttarakhand include Fauji Lalit Mohan Joshi's "Maya Ki Yaad", "Tak Taka Tak Kamla"; Gajendra Rana's "Malu", "Rani Gorkhani", "Lila Ghasyari", "Pushpa"; Pritam Bhartwan's "Saruli" and "Rajuli"; Deepak Chamoli's Nirbhagi Corona & Hey Meri Swani.

Also, with an advance in the technology and easy availability of Uttarakhand video cameras and other recording devices, many musicians produce albums, which has further led to the popularisation of the various folk dance forms of Uttarakhand. Kumaoni/Garhwali songs have gained so much popularity over the years that they have become an integral part of the DJ Music played during weddings and other functions.

 Traditional Music Instruments of Uttarakhand 

 Traditional Music Instruments of Uttarakhand: Traditional Musical Instruments of Uttarakhand reflect the values of Uttarakhandi people. ...
 Dhol: This is a drum in which a wooden or brass hollow is covered with leather at both ends. ...
 Damama: Dama is a percussion instrument made of wood, parchment, and softood. It is a folk instrument, found in Tripura and Meghalaya. A hand drum, it is used by the tribal communities of the hilly areas.
 Hurka : ...
 Turturi or turhi'' : Turhi is a wind instrument made of bronze and brass.
 Binai: Binai is a small instrument made of iron made by local blacksmiths. In shape, it is similar to the horse's cord. There is a thin and flexible band between the two thick attached tweezers of iron.

 Mushak Been or Bagpipe : The mashak (also known as mushak baja, masak, mishek, meshek, moshug, moshaq, moshuq, mashak bin, bin baji) is a type of bagpipe found in Northern India, Uttarakhand, Sudurpaschim Province (especially Baitadi and Darchula district) of Nepal and parts of Pakistan and Afghanistan.
 Murali or Flute :The bansuri is revered as Lord Krishna's divine instrument and is often associated with Krishna's Rasa lila dance. These legends sometimes use alternate names for this wind instrument, such as the murali. However, the instrument is also common among other traditions such as Shaivism.

References 

Uttaranchal
Culture of Uttarakhand